Christopher Bernard Wilder (March 13, 1945 – April 13, 1984), also known as the Beauty Queen Killer, was an Australian-American serial killer who abducted and raped at least twelve young women and girls, torturing some, and killing at least eight of them, during a six-week, cross-country crime spree in the United States in early 1984. Wilder's series of murders began in Florida on February 26, 1984, and continued across the country through Texas, Oklahoma, Colorado, Nevada, and California, and attempted abductions in Washington State and New York State before he was killed during a struggle with police in New Hampshire on April 13, 1984. Wilder is also believed to have raped two girls, aged 10 and 12, in Florida in 1983. Since his death, he has also been considered a suspect in many unsolved murders, including the unsolved 1965 murder of two teenaged girls in his native Sydney.

Early life
Christopher Bernard Wilder was born on March 13, 1945, in Sydney, New South Wales, Australia, the oldest of four sons to an American father, a naval officer, and an Australian mother. He nearly died at birth, and reportedly almost drowned in a swimming pool at the age of two.

On January 4, 1963, aged 17, Wilder raped a 13-year-old girl in company with two other young men, both of whom denied being involved in the actual assault. Wilder was sentenced to probation, and claimed later in life that he also received electroshock therapy. It has been suggested that this therapy aggravated Wilder's violent sexual tendencies. However, journalist Duncan McNab claims there is no evidence that he underwent electroshock therapy, and that the story of Wilder's near-drowning was an invention of Wilder himself.

Wilder married in 1968, but his wife left him after one week. He emigrated to the United States in 1969 and lived in Boynton Beach, Florida in an upscale home and was successful in real estate while developing an interest in photography. From about 1971 through 1975, Wilder faced various charges related to sexual misconduct. He eventually raped a young woman he had lured into his truck on the pretense of photographing her for a modelling contract. This was to become part of his modus operandi during his later crime spree. Despite several convictions, Wilder was never jailed for any of these offenses.

Crime spree
While visiting his parents in Australia in 1982, Wilder was charged with sexual offenses against two 15-year-old girls whom he had forced to pose nude. His parents posted bail and he was allowed to return to Florida to await trial, but court delays prevented his case from ever being heard, as the eventual initial hearing date of April 1984 came after his death. In early 1984, Wilder began a bloody six-week, cross-country crime spree in the United States. He left in his wake eight murder victims, all female.

Florida and Georgia murders
The first murder attributed to Wilder was that of Rosario Teresa Gonzalez, who was last seen on February 26, 1984, at the Miami Grand Prix, where she was employed as a spokesmodel at a temporary job distributing samples of aspirin for a pharmaceutical company. She was paid $200 a day. Witnesses stated that she left the Grand Prix track between noon and 1:00 p.m. with a Caucasian man in his thirties. Her blue 1980 Oldsmobile Cutlass was found parked near Dupont Plaza. Wilder was a race car driver who frequented the Miami Grand Prix racetrack and was also at the race, where he raced in the IMSA GTU class in a Porsche 911. On March 5, Wilder's former girlfriend, Miss Florida finalist Elizabeth Ann Kenyon, 23, went missing. She dated Wilder for a period of time, and was proposed to by him, but she declined due to their age difference; she is  believed to have been last seen with him at a gas station near Miami. Her car was found six days later abandoned at the Miami Airport. Gonzales was an aspiring model at the time of her disappearance and had participated in the Miss Florida beauty contest along with Elizabeth Kenyon. Neither woman's remains have ever been found. On March 18, Wilder led 21-year-old Theresa Wait Ferguson away from the Merritt Square Mall in Merritt Island, Florida. He murdered Ferguson and dumped her body at Canaveral Groves, where it was discovered on March 23.

Wilder's next victim was 19-year-old Linda Grover from Florida State University, whom he abducted from the Governor's Square Mall in Tallahassee, Florida, and transported to Bainbridge, Georgia, on March 20. She had declined his offer to photograph her for a modeling agency, after which he assaulted her in the mall parking lot. Wilder tied Grover's hands, wrapped her in a blanket, and put her in the trunk of his car. Grover was taken to Glen Oaks Motel and was raped. Wilder blinded her with a blow dryer and super glue. He applied copper wires to her feet and passed an electric current through them. When she tried to get away, he beat her, but she escaped and locked herself in the bathroom, where she began pounding on the walls. Wilder fled in his car, taking all of Grover's belongings with him.

Texas and Kansas murders
On March 21, Wilder approached Terry Walden, a 23-year-old wife, mother, and nursing student at Lamar University in Beaumont, Texas, about posing as a model. She turned him down, but ran across him again two days later, March 23, and he kidnapped her then. Wilder stabbed her to death and dumped her body in a canal, where she was found on March 26. After killing Walden, Wilder fled in her rust-colored 1981 Mercury Cougar.

On March 25, Wilder abducted 21-year-old Suzanne Logan at the Penn Square Mall in Oklahoma City. Wilder took her 180 miles north to Newton, Kansas, and checked into room 30 of the I-35 Inn. After breakfast the next morning, he drove to Milford Reservoir, 90 miles northeast of Newton near Junction City, Kansas, where he stabbed her to death and dumped her body under a cedar tree.

Utah and California murders
Wilder took 18-year-old Sheryl Bonaventura captive in Grand Junction, Colorado, on March 29. They were seen together at a diner in Silverton, where they told staff they were heading for Las Vegas with a stop in Durango on the way. On March 30, they were seen at the Four Corners Monument, after which Wilder checked into the Page Boy Motel in Page, Arizona. Wilder shot and stabbed Bonaventura to death around March 31 near the Kanab River in Utah, but her body was not found until May 3.

Wilder killed 17-year-old Michelle Korfman, an aspiring model, who disappeared from a Seventeen magazine cover model competition at the Meadows Mall in Las Vegas on April 1. A photograph was taken of Wilder stalking her at the competition. Her body remained undiscovered near a Southern California roadside rest stop until May 11, and was not identified until mid-June via dental X-rays.

Beth Dodge murder (New York)
On April 4, near Torrance, California, Wilder photographed 16-year-old Tina Marie Risico before abducting her and driving her to El Centro, where he assaulted her. Wilder apparently believed that Risico would be of use in helping him  get other victims, so he kept her alive and took her with him as he traveled back east through Prescott, Arizona, Joplin, Missouri, and Chicago, Illinois. Wilder had been on the FBI's ten most wanted fugitives list since the second week of April.

He and Risico went to Merrillville, Indiana, on April 10, where she helped him abduct 16-year-old Dawnette Wilt at the Southlake Mall. Wilder raped Wilt several times as Risico drove to New York. Near Penn Yan, Wilder took Wilt into the woods and attempted to suffocate her before stabbing her twice and leaving her. Wilt managed to tie a pair of jeans around herself and flag down help. She was taken to Soldiers and Sailors Hospital in Penn Yan by a truck driver, Charlie Laursen. Wilder had doubled back and returned to the spot where he left her to make sure she was dead. He panicked on seeing she had fled.

Dr. John F. Flynn performed a life-saving surgery on Wilt at the hospital and Wilt survived and recuperated at Soldiers and Sailors Hospital. She told local police that Wilder was heading for Canada. At the Eastview Mall in Victor, New York, Wilder forced 33-year-old Beth Dodge into his car and had Risico follow him in Dodge's Pontiac Firebird. After a short drive, Wilder shot Dodge and dumped her body in a gravel pit. Risico and he then drove the Firebird to Logan Airport in Boston, where he bought her a ticket to Los Angeles. Wilder then headed north, and in Beverly, Massachusetts, he attempted to abduct a woman at gunpoint, but was unsuccessful.

Death
On April 13, Wilder stopped at Vic's Getty service station in Colebrook, New Hampshire to ask directions to Canada.  Two New Hampshire state troopers, Leo Jellison and Wayne Fortier, approached Wilder, who retreated to his car to arm himself with a Colt Python .357 Magnum. Jellison was able to grab Wilder from behind and in the scuffle, two shots were fired. The first bullet hit Wilder and exited through his back and into Jellison. The second bullet hit Wilder in the chest. Wilder died; Jellison was seriously wounded, but recovered and returned to full duty.

A copy of the novel The Collector by John Fowles, in which a man keeps a woman in his cellar against her will until she dies, was found among his possessions after his death. Wilder was cremated in Florida, leaving a personal estate worth more than $7 million. In June 1986, a court-appointed arbitrator ruled that the after-tax balance was to be divided among the families of his victims.

Other possible victims
Along with the eight known victims murdered between February and April 1984, Wilder has been suspected in the murders and disappearances of many other women, including some whose remains were found around Florida in areas he was known to frequent and his home country of Australia:
Wilder is one of three suspects in Australia's unsolved Wanda Beach Murders – the murders of 15-year-olds Marianne Schmidt and Christine Sharrock at Wanda Beach, near Sydney, on January 11, 1965 – because of his similarity to a suspect sketch and the fact that two years prior to the Wanda Beach murders, he had been convicted of a gang-rape on a Sydney beach which led police to include him as a suspect. The day after they were both reported missing by family the day before, both bodies were found partially buried in the sand. A blow to the back of the head had shattered Sharrock's skull, and she had received fourteen knife wounds. Schmidt had been stabbed six times and had her throat severely cut. Attempts had been made to rape both girls, and their underwear had been cut. Both girls had semen stains on their clothes, but an autopsy revealed that their hymens were still intact. The case is currently the oldest under review by the New South Wales unsolved homicide unit.
Wilhelmina Kruger, a 56-year-old cleaning lady, was murdered at Wollongong's Piccadilly Centre on Saturday, January 29, 1966. A butcher who had arrived for work at 5:45 a.m. found her bloody body at the bottom of the basement-level staircase. She had been forcibly pulled down the escalators and stairs after being attacked three stories up, possibly around 4:30 a.m. She was discovered naked from the chest down, having been stabbed, strangled, and mutilated. Additionally, the police discovered burns from cigarettes on her clothing and blond hair at the site. Prior to the murder, Kruger started to feel as though someone was stalking her, so her husband drove her to work. The lights in the Centre's parking lot had also recently displayed signs of tampering and had been altered once more the morning of the murder. When a witness who lived close to the Centre claimed seeing a car driving by at roughly 4:55 a.m. on the day of the murder while he was waiting at the gate of his property for the morning newspaper delivery, it provided a significant clue during the investigation. The witness described the car as a rusted, cream-coloured utility, potentially like a Holden or Chevrolet model, and with a plywood cover fastened to the back of the vehicle. The driver was described by the witness as a tall, lean person who appeared dishevelled. This account was verified by two Victoria visitors who were staying at the Piccadilly Centre motel and who just before Kruger's murder inquired about lodging options nearby. The pair claimed that shortly after the murder, they heard the sound of a car driving away from the Piccadilly Centre. The person the witnesses described fitted the previous witness' account of a male he saw speeding close to the Piccadilly Centre shortly after Kruger was killed. He was allegedly driving a car that also matched the witness' description, according to the pair. The homicide is still unsolved and is regarded as one of the most horrific in state history.
A 27-year-old store employee and prostitute from Bondi named Anna Toskayoa Dowlingkoa vanished after leaving the Taxi Club in Kings Cross on Wednesday, February 16, 1966, at midnight. Ten days later, on February 26, at about 5:30 p.m., a truck driver who had stopped at the side of Old Illawarra Road in Menai to fix a tire discovered her partially clothed, stabbed, strangled, and mutilated body. Drag evidence revealed that Dowlingkoa's body had been moved to a more obvious position three to four days or so before her body was discovered. The majority of Dowlingkoa's clothing and belongings were also missing. Police immediately linked her brutal "Jack the Ripper-like murder" with that of Kruger, and investigators from that crime were called in to assist. They believed that the murder might have been the work of the Wanda Beach Killer, primarily based on circumstantial evidence and similarities in modus operandi.
An unidentified woman's body was discovered in a field in Caledonia, New York, on November 10, 1979. She had been shot twice, once in the front of the head and once in the back, and was the victim of a homicide. She was discovered shortly after her death, but she remained a Jane Doe until 2015 when she was identified as Tammy Jo Alexander, a 16-year-old who had vanished from Brooksville, Florida previously in 1979. Alexander may be connected to Wilder due to the fact that she was discovered wearing an "Auto Sports Products, Inc." jacket. Photographer and race car driver Wilder was well-known for using 'Auto Sports' goods. A .38 calibre bullet that killed Alexander was found in the dirt beneath her body. This caliber ammunition is commonly used in .357 calibre revolvers like the one Wilder attempted to use on the troopers. There is no evidence that the round's compatibility with the pistol was determined through ballistic testing. However, she was seen eating at a diner with a man who has never been found the night before her body was discovered. He has been identified as a person of interest in her slaying. She had consumed food that was consistent with the restaurant where she had been seen, according to the autopsy. The man Alexander was with paid for their order, but he remains unidentified and supposedly bore little resemblance to Wilder.
Wilder is a suspect in the unsolved disappearance of Mary Opitz. The 17-year-old disappeared in Fort Myers, Florida, on January 16, 1981, and was last seen walking towards a parking lot. Another girl who physically resembled Opitz, Mary Hare, disappeared on February 11, 1981, from the same parking lot. Hare's body, which had decomposed, was found in June 1981; she had been stabbed in the back and was the victim of a homicide. Authorities began to suspect foul play was involved in Opitz's case following this, but Opitz's case remains unsolved.
Skeletal remains were discovered in a green nylon bag on May 29, 1982, in a shallow grave at the 300 block of F Road, north of Southern Boulevard, in Loxahatchee, Florida. Although the manner of her death is unknown, the fact that her fingerprints were severed suggested that her murderer knew her well and was concerned about being associated with the crime if the body was identified. According to dental records and the fact that the decedent had an asymmetrical face, 17-year-old Tina Marie Beebe's remains were identified as hers in July 2013 by the Palm Beach County Sheriff's Office. On January 20, 1981, she told her sister Marth that a man had offered her a job as a model before she disappeared in southern Florida. A few elements of Beebe's instance match Wilder's modus operandi. Like Beebe, Wilder killed adolescent girls or young women after offering them modelling jobs. His victims were White or Hispanic. An unidentified woman was also found nearby a few months after Beebe's body was found. They were found in areas that were close to property owned by Wilder.
On December 19, 1982, a real estate agent who was inspecting land discovered severely decomposed remains that belonged to a female. They were dispersed throughout thick bush in a wooded location 140 yards north of Okeechobee Road off F Road, close to Loxahatchee. According to the autopsy report, she was shot once in the head and died as a result. On May 29, 1982, Tina Marie Beebe, a teenage girl, was also discovered in the vicinity; however, her remains were not identified until 2013. They were found in areas that were close to property owned by Wilder. Authorities refer to the woman only as the Palm Beach County Jane Doe because she remains unidentified.
Nancy Kay Brown, a 25-year-old native of Rantoul, Illinois, disappeared while vacationing in Cocoa Beach, Florida, on June 6, 1983. Her remains were discovered in Canaveral Groves on March 8, 1984. She was a victim of a homicide. Officials believe she died from a blow to the head.
Shari Lynne Ball, a 20-year-old aspiring model, went missing on June 27, 1983 from Boca Raton, Florida. Her badly decomposed body was found by a hunter in Shelby, New York, on October 29, 1983, but was not identified until 2014. Her cause of death could not be determined, but foul play was suspected. Wilder is currently being looked at for possible involvement since it matches his modus operandi, but no evidence links him to the crime. She was found 38 miles from where Tammy Alexander was found, in Caledonia, New York.
Tammy Lynn Leppert, 18, was last seen around 11:30 a.m. on July 6, 1983, in Cocoa Beach, Florida, while in a heated argument with a male companion. Leppert's family filed a $1 million lawsuit against Wilder before his death, but dropped the suit afterward. Leppert's mother, modelling agent Linda Curtis, claimed that Wilder and Tammy met on the set of the 1983 comedy film Spring Break in Fort Lauderdale. She further claimed that he travelled to Brevard County where they lived in a fruitless effort to convince her to let him photograph Tammy. She also recalled that a man strongly resembling him visited her modelling agency several times in 1983, looking for models. However, she later stated that she never believed Wilder was involved in Tammy's disappearance. Police were never able to link Wilder and Leppert, and it may be coincidence that she disappeared at the same time he was targeting area models. He had a long history of sex crimes, but did not begin his killing spree until almost a year after she vanished.
An unidentified young woman, the Broward County Jane Doe, was found floating in a canal on February 18, 1984, in Davie, Florida. She had been strangled to death and was thought to have been dead two days prior to being found.
On March 7, 1984, Melody Marie Gay, 19, was abducted while working the graveyard shift at an all-night store in Collier County, Florida; her body was pulled from a rural canal three days later. Due to the similarities between her murder and Wilder's crimes, they were thought to be connected, but he has since been ruled out as a suspect.
Wilder is the primary suspect in the disappearance of 15-year-old Colleen Orsborn, who went missing after leaving her Daytona Beach home on March 15, 1984. She missed the school bus on the day of her disappearance and her mother gave her some money so she could take the county bus to school. Orsborn never arrived, however. She is believed to have skipped school to go to the beach. Wilder was staying at a motel in Daytona Beach on that same date. The disappearance of Colleen fits the pattern of Wilder, who often attacked near his birthdate of March 13. Also, one of Orsborn's classmates stated a man resembling Wilder had offered her $100 to pose for pictures. However, though he checked out on the day Orsborn disappeared, no evidence has been found to connect them. Her body was discovered a few weeks later, partially buried near a lake in Orange County, Florida, although it was initially ruled not to be her, and was not formally identified using DNA testing until February 2011.

Ruled-out victims
On May 3, 1973, a man walking his dog discovered the bodies of sisters Mary Jenkins, 16, and Marguerite "Maggie" Jenkins, 18, in a wooded area in Key Largo, about 100 miles from where they were last seen. They were seen the day before trying to hitchhike back to their home in Gloucester, New Jersey. Both girls had been sexually assaulted as well as had been subjected to blunt force trauma and shot to death. Authorities looked into the possibility that Wilder was the person responsible for the murders as he had already been attacking women and resided in Boynton Beach in 1973, which is 150 miles from Key Largo. However, Wilder was eliminated as a suspect when DNA evidence recovered from a bite mark on one of the girls did not match him.

In popular culture
Wilder earned the nickname the Beauty Queen Killer as a result of his crimes. The 1986 made-for-television movie Easy Prey dramatises a series of events based on Wilder's story.

See also 
List of serial killers in the United States
List of serial killers by number of victims
List of serial rapists

References

External links
Easy Prey (TV Movie 1986) at IMDb
miamiherald.com

1945 births
1984 deaths
American rapists
American serial killers
American spree killers
Australian emigrants to the United States
Australian rapists
Australian serial killers
Australian spree killers
FBI Ten Most Wanted Fugitives
Fugitives
Male serial killers
People from Boynton Beach, Florida
People from Sydney
Suicides by firearm in New Hampshire